Timmins High and Vocational School is an English-language public secondary school in Timmins, Ontario, Canada, part of the District School Board Ontario North East.

See also
List of high schools in Ontario

References

External links
 

High schools in Timmins
High schools in Ontario
1923 establishments in Ontario
Educational institutions established in 1923